William Robert Woodall III  (born February 11, 1970) is an American attorney and politician who was the U.S. representative for  from 2011 to 2021. The district included most of Gwinnett County, a suburban county northeast of Atlanta. A Republican, Woodall prior to being elected to Congress, worked for his predecessor, John Linder from 1994 to 2010, eventually becoming Linder's chief of staff. Woodall announced in February 2019 that he would not seek reelection to a sixth term in Congress.

Early life, education, and career
Woodall was born in Athens, Georgia. He attended both public and private grade schools, graduating from Marist School in 1988. He received a B.A. from Furman University followed by law school at the University of Georgia School of Law. While attending law school, he spent summers working in a Washington, D.C. law firm. He left law school after the summer of 1994 to work for his hometown U.S. Representative, John Linder, where he began working as a legislative correspondent and eventually served as Linder's chief of staff in 2000. Woodall received his J.D. degree from the University of Georgia School of Law in 1998. Woodall is a member of the Methodist Church.

U.S. House of Representatives
2010 election

Woodall won the Republican primary with about 56% of the vote against Jody Hice. He faced Democrat Doug Heckman in the 2010 General Election. On November 2, 2010, Woodall defeated Heckman to win the general election.

The top donors to Woodall's campaign were the Credit Union National Association, the Southern Company, the American Dental Association, and the Vision for Tomorrow Fund.

Woodall addressed the U.S. House on October 26, 2011, calling for reduced regulations on businesses.

2012 election
In 2012, Woodall won the election with 62.16% of the 252,066 votes cast, against Steve Reilly (D).

2014 election
In 2014, Woodall won the election with 65.39% of the 173,669 votes cast, against Thomas D. Wight (D).

2016 election
In 2016, Woodall won the election with 60.38% of the 288,301 votes cast, against Rashid Malik (D).

2018 election
In 2018, Woodall faced Democratic challenger Carolyn Bourdeaux. Woodall was supported by the  Great America Committee, a political action committee registered by Vice President Mike Pence. The race proved to be unexpectedly competitive, and Woodall defeated Bourdeaux by only 433 votes after a recount. The race was the closest of the 2018 House elections. It was the closest that a Democrat has come to winning this district since its creation in 1993 (it was numbered as the 4th District from 1993 to 1997, the 11th from 1997 to 2003, and has been the 7th since 2003).

Tenure

Woodall took office as part of the 112th United States Congress in January 2011. In July 2014, Woodall was elected chairman of the Republican Study Committee, a group of conservative Republican lawmakers, succeeding Steve Scalise. Woodall was replaced as chairman in November 2014 by Bill Flores (TX-17).

Committee assignments
House Rules Committee
House Budget Committee
House Transportation & Infrastructure Committee

Political positions

Interest group ratings

Woodall has a 66 percent rating from conservative policy advocacy organization Heritage Action for his voting record.

Woodall has a "B" rating from marijuana legalization advocacy organization the National Organization for the Reform of Marijuana Laws (NORML) for his voting history regarding cannabis-related causes.

Economic issues 

Woodall supports tax reform and FairTax.

He voted in favor of the Tax Cuts and Jobs Act of 2017. After the passage of the bill, Woodall stated that it "marks tremendous progress and is the fulfillment of a commitment made to the American people."

Woodall was one of only six House Republicans in the 112th Congress who did not sign Grover Norquist's "Taxpayer Protection Pledge," stating that "my commitment to the Fair Tax and a common-sense tax overhaul makes it impossible for me to support the second component of the Pledge, which states that I must 'oppose any net reduction or elimination of deductions and credits, unless matched dollar for dollar by further reducing tax rates.'"

Health care

Woodall opposes the Affordable Care Act (Obamacare), voting to repeal it.

Woodall co-sponsored the Sanctity of Human Life Act. In October 2011, Woodall voted for legislation to restrict how private insurance companies listed on a public insurance exchange may offer abortion coverage.

LGBT rights 

Upon the legalization of same-sex marriage in the U.S, Woodall disagreed with the federal government's approach to deciding the issue for the entire nation, rather than allowing states to make the decision individually.

Gun rights 

Woodall was one of only six Republicans who opposed legislation that would require all states to honor the concealed weapons permits of other states, arguing that the bill was unnecessary because the Second Amendment to the United States Constitution already gives Americans the right to bear arms.

National security 

On July 24, 2013, Woodall voted against Representative Justin Amash's (R-Michigan) amendment to HR 2397 which would have ended the National Security Agency's ability to collect and store data on the phone calls of every American without a warrant.

Mueller investigation 
Woodall stated in June 2019 that he had not read the Mueller report about Russian interference in the 2016 presidential election.

References

External links

 
 
 

|-

|-

1970 births
21st-century American politicians
American Methodists
Furman University alumni
Living people
Marist School (Georgia) alumni
Methodists from Georgia (U.S. state)
Politicians from Athens, Georgia
Political chiefs of staff
Republican Party members of the United States House of Representatives from Georgia (U.S. state)
United States congressional aides
University of Georgia alumni